Nicolò Bruschi (born 12 August 1998) is an Italian professional footballer who plays as a winger for  club Pro Sesto.

Club career
Bruschi scored 30 goals in 33 appearances for Fiorenzuola on 2020–21 Serie D season, the club won the Group and was promoted to Serie C. After the campaign, Bruschi was signed by Pisa, and loaned to Fiorenzuola for the 2021–2022 season.

On 22 July 2022, Bruschi signed with Pro Sesto.

References

External links
 
 

1998 births
Living people
Sportspeople from Parma
Italian footballers
Association football forwards
Serie C players
Serie D players
Parma Calcio 1913 players
U.S. Sassuolo Calcio players
Santarcangelo Calcio players
A.C. Cuneo 1905 players
S.S. Arezzo players
A.C. Gozzano players
S.S. Chieti Calcio players
F.C. Vado players
U.S. Fiorenzuola 1922 S.S. players
Pisa S.C. players
S.S.D. Pro Sesto players
Footballers from Emilia-Romagna